Cusack Park (Páirc Uí Chíosóg in Irish) is a GAA stadium in Ennis, County Clare, Ireland. It is the primary home of the Clare Hurling, Gaelic Football, Camogie and Peil na mBan teams at all grades.

Named after the founder of the GAA, Michael Cusack, the ground had an original capacity of about 28,000 (mostly terraced), but following a 2011 safety review, the certified capacity was reduced to 14,864.

Three sides of the ground are terraced - the two areas behind the goals and one terraced length of the pitch which is also covered.

In 2006 there were media reports of substantial offers from property developers to buy the stadium and relocate it to a new 42,000 capacity site outside the town centre. However, by 2009 it appeared unlikely given the recent Celtic Tiger crash that this would happen. Between 2009–12, Clare GAA invested over €500,000 in refurbishment works including pitch drainage and fencing around the pitch. In 2015 a major renovation started, this included the demolition and re-erection of the main stand and construction of a new entrance/exit at the north side of the stadium. Once completed in late 2017 the official capacity was increased to 19,000 people for the start of the 2018 season.

On 17 June 2018 the stadium was completely sold out for the first time since re-opening for the visit of local rivals Limerick GAA

The knockout stages of the Clare Senior Hurling Championship and the Clare Senior Football Championship are held annually in the stadium.

See also
List of Gaelic Athletic Association stadiums
List of stadiums in Ireland by capacity

References

External links
 Stadium Location
 World Stadiums Article

Buildings and structures in Ennis
Clare GAA
Gaelic games grounds in the Republic of Ireland
Sports venues in County Clare